Tseng Kwong Chi, known as Joseph Tseng prior to his professional career (September 6, 1950 – March 10, 1990), was a Hong Kong-born American photographer who was active in the East Village art scene in the 1980s. He is the brother of dancer/choreographer Muna Tseng.

Work
Tseng was part of a circle of artists in the 1980s New York art scene including Keith Haring, Kenny Scharf, and Cindy Sherman.

Tseng's most famous body of work is his self-portrait series, East Meets West, also called the "Expeditionary Series". In the series, Tseng dressed in what he called his "Mao suit" and sunglasses (dubbed a "wickedly surrealistic persona" by the New York Times) and photographed himself situated, often emotionlessly, in front of iconic tourist sites. These included the Statue of Liberty, Cape Canaveral, Disney Land, Notre Dame de Paris, and the World Trade Center.

Tseng also took tens of thousands of photographs of New York graffiti artist Keith Haring throughout the 1980s working on murals, installations and the subway. In 1984, his photographs were shown with Haring's work at the opening of the Semaphore Gallery East location in a show titled "Art in Transit". Tseng photographed the first Concorde landing at Kennedy International Airport, from the tarmac.  According to his sister, Tseng drew artistic influence from Brassaï and Cartier-Bresson.

Life 
Although born in Hong Kong, Tseng's parents moved the family to Canada when he was sixteen. He originally studied painting at Academie Julian, but switched to photography after one year. Tseng died of AIDS-related illness in 1990, and was survived by his companion of seven years, Robert-Kristoffer Haynes, who remains a resident of New York City and serves as Registrar at Paula Cooper Gallery. Tseng's work is in the public collection of the Solomon R. Guggenheim Museum in New York and San Francisco Museum of Modern Art.  Tseng has been included in the Asian American Arts Centre's digital archive.

Books

Chi, Tseng Kwong & Richard Martin, Tseng Kwong Chi (Kyoto Shoin International Co., Ltd / Art Random, Kyoto, Japan, 1990)
Tseng Kwong Chi, Ambiguous Ambassador (Nazraeli Press, 2005)
Cameron, Dan & Wei, Lily, Tseng Kwong Chi: Self Portraits 1979-1989 (Ben Brown Fine Arts & Paul Kasmin Gallery, 2008)
Kwong Chi Tseng, Tseng Kwong Chi, Citizen of the World (Ben Brown Fine Arts Hong Kong, 2014)
Chi, Tseng Kwong, Amy Brandt, Alexandra Chang, Lynn Gumpert, Joshua Takano Chambers-Letson, Muna Tseng, Tseng Kwong Chi: Performing For the Camera (Chrysler Museum of Art, Grey Art Gallery, New York University in association with Lyons Artbooks, 2015)

References

External links
Estate of Tseng Kwong Chi
New York Times obituary - March 11, 1990
New York Times - Arts - Inside Photography - October 18, 1996

1950 births
1990 deaths
20th-century American photographers
American LGBT photographers
American gay artists
American artists of Chinese descent
Gay photographers
Hong Kong emigrants to the United States
AIDS-related deaths in New York (state)
Chinese contemporary artists
American LGBT people of Asian descent
20th-century Hong Kong LGBT people